Berlusconism is a term used in the Western media and by some Italian analysts to describe the political positions of former Prime Minister Silvio Berlusconi. In general, Berlusconism could be reassumed as a mix of conservatism, populism, liberism, anti-communism and Atlanticism.

Other observers describe it as more of a personality-driven populist movement, where "a billionaire businessman and television personality" pledges to use his unique skills to "represent the interests of ordinary people" against the political establishment; and where the "scandals, investigations, and trials" that follow him  are dismissed by his passionately loyal base of supporters as evidence that he is “the most persecuted” person in history.

Origins and features

The term "Berlusconism" emerged in the 1980s, characterised by a strongly positive connotation as synonym of the "entrepreneurial optimism" of the time, defined as an entrepreneurial spirit which is not discouraged by difficulties, with a confidence in being able to solve problems. However, starting in the 21st century and in consequence of the increasing identification of Berlusconi as a primarily political figure, the attributed meaning changed in the context of journalistic and political language.

According to the Italian definition given by the online vocabulary of the Encyclopedia Institute, Berlusconism has a wide range of meanings, all having their origins in the figure of Berlusconi and the political movement inspired by him: the substantive refers not only to the "thought movement", but also to the "social phenomenon" and even the phenomenon "of custom" bound to his entrepreneurial and political figure. The term Berlusconism is also used to refer to a certain laissez-faire vision supported by him, not only of the economy and the markets, but also with reference to the same policy.

According to his political opponents and business rivals, Berlusconism is only a form of demagogic populism, comparable to fascism, stressing the fact that Berlusconi has declared his admiration for Benito Mussolini, even though he has criticised the racial Fascist laws and the alliance with Nazi Germany, referring to himself as pro-Israel. In 2013, he returned to calling Mussolini a good leader whose biggest mistake was signing up to exterminate the Jews. His supporters instead compare Berlusconism to the French Gaullism and the Argentine Peronism.

Political positions
Berlusconi defines himself and by extension Berlusconism as moderate, liberal and pro-free trade (liberismo), but he is often also described as a populist or a conservative leader. Berlusconism is also described as liberal-conservative, or conservative-liberal, but it is sometimes associated with right-wing populism. After his resignation in 2011, Berlusconi has become increasingly Eurosceptical and he is often critical of German Chancellor Angela Merkel. However, there is also an opinion that Berlusconi is a pro-European.

A feature of Berlusconi's leadership tactics is to use the party as a mean to gain power (with the party described as a "light party" because of its lack of a complex internal structure). This is decidedly comparable to the political tactics used by Charles De Gaulle in France. Another feature of great importance is the emphasis on a "liberal revolution", publicised and summarised by the "Contract with the Italians" of 2001. A strong reformism is added to these pillars, principally of the form of the Italian state and the constitution" in favour of moving from a parliamentary system to a semi-presidential system, a higher election threshold, the abolition of the Senate, the halving in size of the Chamber of Deputies, the abolition of the provinces and the reform of the judiciary, with separation of the careers between magistrates and magistrates's civil responsibility, from Berlusconi considered impartial. Berlusconi has declared himself to be persecuted by the judiciary, having undergone 34 processes, accusing them of being manipulated by the political left and comparing himself to Enzo Tortora as a victim of a miscarriage of justice. More recently, Berlusconi has declared himself in favour of civil unions.

Comparisons to other leaders
A number of writers and political commentators consider Berlusconi's political success a precedent for the 2016 election of real estate tycoon Donald Trump as the 45th President of the United States, with most noting Berlusconi's panned Prime Minister tenure and therefore making the comparison in dismay. Roger Cohen of The New York Times argued: "Widely ridiculed, endlessly written about, long unscathed by his evident misogyny and diverse legal travails, Berlusconi proved a Teflon politician. [...] Nobody who knows Berlusconi and has watched the rise and rise of Donald Trump can fail to be struck by the parallels".

In The Daily Beast, Barbie Latza Nadeau wrote: "If Americans are wondering just what a Trump presidency would look like, they only need to look at the traumatized remains of Italy after Berlusconi had his way".

Opponents have been critical of Nabil Karoui's consolidation of the Tunisian media landscape and the intentions of his charitable activities, often referring to him as the "Tunisian Berlusconi". Other mass media owners like Cem Uzan or Pavol Rusko have been compared to him.

References

Further reading
 Diodato, Emidio, and Federico Niglia. Berlusconi ‘The Diplomat’: Populism and Foreign Policy in Italy (Springer, 2018).

Silvio Berlusconi
Conservative liberalism
Conservatism in Italy
Liberal conservatism
Liberalism in Italy
Anti-communism in Italy
Eponymous political ideologies
Populism
Right-wing populism in Italy